Oconto is a city in Oconto County, Wisconsin, United States. The population was 4,609 at the 2020 census. It is part of the Green Bay Metropolitan Statistical Area. The city is located partially within the town of Oconto.

History
Oconto is home to Copper Culture State Park, which has remains dated to around 5000-6000 B.C. It is a burial ground of the Copper Culture Indians. This burial ground is considered to be the oldest cemetery in Wisconsin and one of the oldest in the nation. Their descendants include the Menominee, who have lived here for thousands of years. 

The first Europeans to come to the area were the French, who considered it to be part of New France. The French Jesuit, Roman Catholic priest, and missionary, Father Claude-Jean Allouez said the first Mass in Oconto on December 3, 1669. The Menominee living here began participating in the fur trade network and converting to Christianity. This area was included in the land ceded by the Menominee to the United States government in the 1836 Treaty of the Cedars. In this treaty, the Menominee ceded over four million acres of land after years of negotiations about how to accommodate the Oneida, Stockbridge-Munsee, and Brothertown peoples who were being removed from New York to Wisconsin. Following the treaty, the land became officially available for American settlement, although soldiers and lumberers had already been here for some time. The same year the Treaty of the Cedars was signed, George Lurwick bought a home and sawmill along the Oconto River, becoming the town's first private land owner now that the land had been sold to the United States.

The city of Oconto was incorporated in 1869. The city took its name from the nearby Oconto River. The name Okāqtow is a Menominee name meaning "the place of the pike", one of several pike-related place-names in the area. 

The first Christian Science church in the world was erected in 1886 in Oconto and still stands at the corner of Main Street and Chicago Street. The land was donated by Henry (1837–1904) and Victoria Sargent (1848–1930).

In the summer of 1952, during a two-day period, an estimated 175,000,000 Leopard frogs emerged from nearby marshes and enveloped the town. The water level of Lake Michigan rose in the spring, flooding the wetlands. The Leopard frogs laid their eggs, and when the lake level receded with the heat of summer, most of the eggs would die. But in 1952, Lake Michigan remained high, and a huge number of frog eggs grew into live amphibians.

Geography

Oconto is located at  (44.8877, -87.8704).

Oconto is located at the mouth of the Oconto River, which feeds into Lake Michigan.

Demographics

The table with historical census data indicates that the population has remained relatively flat throughout the 20th century.

2020 census
As of the census of 2020, the population was 4,609. The racial makeup of the city was 91.8% White, 2.1% Native American, 0.5% Black or African American, 0.4% Asian, 0.7% from other races, and 4.5% from two or more races. Ethnically, the population was 3.1% Hispanic or Latino of any race.

2010 census
As of the census of 2010, there were 4,513 people, 1,872 households, and 1,172 families residing in the city. The racial makeup of the city was 96.4% White, 0.7% African American, 1.1% Native American, 0.4% Asian, 0.4% from other races, and 1.2% from two or more races. Hispanic or Latino of any race were 2.4% of the population.

There were 1,872 households, of which 30.0% had children under the age of 18 living with them, 45.1% were married couples living together, 11.4% had a female householder with no husband present, 6.1% had a male householder with no wife present, and 37.4% were non-families. 32.2% of all households were made up of individuals, and 15.1% had someone living alone who was 65 years of age or older. The average household size was 2.35 and the average family size was 2.95.

The median age in the city was 39.6 years. 23.4% of residents were under the age of 18; 8.9% were between the ages of 18 and 24; 24.5% were from 25 to 44; 27.3% were from 45 to 64; and 15.8% were 65 years of age or older. The gender makeup of the city was 49.7% male and 50.3% female.

2000 census
As of the census of 2000, there were 4,708 people, 1,870 households, and 1,221 families residing in the city. The population density was 683.7 people per square mile (263.8/km2). There were 2,040 housing units at an average density of 296.2 per square mile (114.3/km2). The racial makeup of the city was 97.79% White, 0.02% Black or African American, 0.85% Native American, 0.17% Asian, 0.06% Pacific Islander, 0.21% from other races, and 0.89% from two or more races. 0.79% of the population were Hispanic or Latino of any race.

There were 1,870 households, out of which 33.2% had children under the age of 18 living with them, 49.1% were married couples living together, 11.5% had a female householder with no husband present, and 34.7% were non-families. 29.3% of all households were made up of individuals, and 15.0% had someone living alone who was 65 years of age or older. The average household size was 2.44 and the average family size was 2.99.

In the city, the population was spread out, with 25.8% under the age of 18, 8.8% from 18 to 24, 27.8% from 25 to 44, 21.0% from 45 to 64, and 16.7% who were 65 years of age or older. The median age was 37 years. For every 100 females, there were 92.2 males. For every 100 females age 18 and over, there were 89.0 males.

The median income for a household in the city was $34,589, and the median income for a family was $43,676. Males had a median income of $27,455 versus $22,083 for females. The per capita income for the city was $20,717. About 5.2% of families and 8.8% of the population were below the poverty line, including 9.6% of those under age 18 and 10.5% of those age 65 or over.

Education

The following schools are available in Oconto:
Oconto Elementary School
Oconto Literacy Charter School
Oconto Middle School
Oconto High School

Transportation

Major highways
 Northbound travels to Marinette. South it continues toward Green Bay.
 connects with Oconto Falls and Gillett southbound.

Airport
J. Douglas Bake Memorial Airport (KOCQ) serves the city and surrounding communities.

Notable businesses

Cruisers yachts, a builder of luxury pleasure yachts

Notable people

George E. Ansorge, Wisconsin State Representative
Lewis S. Bailey, Wisconsin State Representative
Alexander Brazeau, Wisconsin State Representative
John B. Chase, Wisconsin State Senator
David Guy Classon, U.S. Representative
Pahl Davis, NFL player
Thomas A. Delaney, Wisconsin State Representative
Jake Dickert, Head Football Coach, Washington State University
Tony Dollinger, NFL player
Hermina Franks, AAGPBL ballplayer
Ernst Funke, Wisconsin State Representative
George Clay Ginty, Union Army general
Charles Hall, Wisconsin State Representative
Fay Holderness, actress
Richard W. Hubbell, Wisconsin State Representative
Reuben La Fave, Wisconsin State Senator
Marty Larsen, Wisconsin State Representative
Frank J. Lingelbach, Wisconsin State Representative
Red Mack, NFL player
Bob McDougal, NFL player
Jab Murray, NFL player
Alvin O'Konski, U.S. Representative
Louis P. Pahl, Wisconsin State Representative
Edward Scofield, Governor of Wisconsin
Warren R. Smith, Wisconsin State Treasurer
Landy Scott, champion race car driver
William T. Sullivan, Wisconsin State Representative
Deral Teteak, football player
Blaine Walsh, sports announcer
Arthur J. Whitcomb, Wisconsin State Representative and lawyer
William Henry Young, Wisconsin State Representative
John E. Youngs, Wisconsin State Representative

References

External links

City of Oconto
Sanborn fire insurance maps: 1883 1887 1893 1898 1904 1911 1919

Cities in Wisconsin
Cities in Oconto County, Wisconsin
Wisconsin populated places on Lake Michigan
County seats in Wisconsin
Green Bay metropolitan area
Populated places established in 1869
1869 establishments in Wisconsin